Thomas Jarrid Wilson (September 18, 1988 – September 9, 2019) was an American pastor and author.

He worked for 18 months at Harvest Christian Fellowship in Riverside, California, and he had previously pastored at Highpoint Church in Memphis, Tennessee, Home Church Nashville in Nashville, Tennessee, and at LifePoint Church in Smyrna, Tennessee. He and his wife, Juli, founded Anthem of Hope, a program for people with depression.

Wilson had two sons. He died by suicide at the age of 30 on September 9, 2019.

Selected works

References

External links

1988 births
2019 suicides
Suicides in the United States
American Protestant ministers and clergy
21st-century American male writers
21st-century American non-fiction writers
American male non-fiction writers
American religious writers